Phillip Moore was a Democratic politician from California, who served in the California State Assembly from the 16th district. He later served as Speaker of the Assembly in 1860. He also served in the Confederate Army during the Civil War

References 

Year of birth missing
Year of death missing
Speakers of the California State Assembly